Anastasia Alexandrovna Frolova (born 21 June 1994) is a Russian former professional tennis player.

On 6 November 2017, Frolova reached her best singles ranking of world No. 298. On 10 September 2018, she peaked at No. 251 in the doubles rankings. In her career, she won one singles title and eleven doubles titles on the ITF Women's Circuit.

Frolova was given a wildcard into the doubles main draw of the 2012 Kremlin Cup, partnering Margarita Gasparyan.

ITF Circuit finals

Singles: 4 (1 title, 3 runner–ups)

Doubles: 19 (11 titles, 8 runner–ups)

External links
 
 

1994 births
Living people
Russian female tennis players
Tennis players from Moscow
21st-century Russian women
20th-century Russian women